was a Japanese actor, voice actor and narrator. He was represented by OYS Produce. His son is a fellow voice actor .

He was most known for the roles of Ashuraman, The Omegaman, Prisman (Kinnikuman: Scramble for the Throne), Genji Togashi (Sakigake!! Otokojuku), Flazzard (Dragon Quest: Dai's Great Adventure), Black Dragon (Saint Seiya), and Ein (Fist of the North Star).

Yamaguchi died on October 24, 2011, due to acute heart failure.

Filmography

Television animation
 Sakigake!! Otokojuku (1988) (Genji Togashi)
 Zatch Bell! (2003) (Hosokawa, Nakata-sensei)
 Black Lagoon (2006) (Ibraha)
 Lemon Angel Project (2006) (Danny Yamaguchi)
 Sgt. Frog (2006) (Merosu Seijin)

Unknown date
 Kinnikuman: Scramble for the Throne (Ashuraman, Prisman (First), The Omegaman)
 Yaiba (Snakeman)
 La Blue Girl (King Seikima, Narrator, Ninja)
 Warrior of Love Rainbowman (Gota Yamada)
 Fist of the North Star 2 (Ein)
 Adventure Kid (Officer)
 Saint Seiya (Black Dragon, Tarantula Arachne)
 The Transformers 2010 (Blurr)
 Tatakae!! Ramenman (Ryuseiken Hogan)
 Digimon Savers (MetalPhantomon)
 Dragon Quest: Dai's Great Adventure (Flazzard)
 Dragon Ball Z (Blueberry)
 Urotsukidoji (Munchausen, Monk, D-9)
 Violence Jack (Aids, Gokumon)
 Sonic X (Decoe, Nelson Thorndyke)
 Dragon Ball GT (Si Xing Long)
 Himitsu no Akko-chan (3rd series) (Papa)
 Yokoyama Mitsuteru Sangokushi (Pang Tong)
 Last Exile (Walker, Greyhound)
 Machine Robo: Battle Hackers (Gakurandar)
 Marmalade Boy (Takuji Kijima)
 Melody of Oblivion (Child Dragon)
 Miracle Girls (Shinichiro Kageura)
 Oku-sama wa Mahō Shōjo: Bewitched Agnes (Koichi Shioya)
 Monster (Iwai)
 Magical Doremi (Shingo Hasegawa's Father)
 Legend of the Galactic Heroes (Vargenzile)
 Street Fighter Zero The Animation (Gouken)
 Hyper Doll (Detective Todo)

Tokusatsu
 Hikari Sentai Maskman (xxxx) (Cabira Doggler)
 Kousoku Sentai Turboranger (xxxx) (Picture Book Boma)
 Choujin Sentai Jetman (xxxx) (Vacuum Cleaner Jigen)

DubbingBuffalo Bill and the Indians, or Sitting Bull's History Lesson (1981 TV Asahi edition) (Ed Goodman (Harvey Keitel))Indiana Jones and the Last Crusade'' (Young Indiana Jones (River Phoenix))

References

1956 births
2011 deaths
Japanese male stage actors
Japanese male video game actors
Japanese male voice actors
Male voice actors from Tokyo